BLK may refer to:

Locations
 Blackpool Airport (BLK), airport in England
 Burgenlandkreis (BLK), district in Saxony-Anhalt, Germany

Organisations
 BLK, an Australian sports clothing company
 BlackRock, the American investment management firm 
 Basket Liga Kobiet (Women's Basketball League), the top women's basketball league in Poland

Brands
 BLK (magazine)1988–1994 US magazine
 Bonluck Bus, a Chinese bus manufacturer
 Mercedes Benz BLK-Class

Other
 BLK (gene), gene in humans
 B lymphocyte kinase
 Ray BLK, a British singer
 Pa'O language (ISO 639-3 code blk)

See also